Tailly is a commune in the Ardennes department in northern France. The commune was formed on 1 January 1973, as the union of 4 former communes: Andevanne, Barricourt, Rémonville and Tailly.

Population

See also
Communes of the Ardennes department

References

Communes of Ardennes (department)
Ardennes communes articles needing translation from French Wikipedia